The Confederate Monument in Portsmouth, Virginia, was built between 1876 and 1881. It was listed on the National Register of Historic Places (NRHP) in 1997.

The monument is a 35-foot obelisk of North Carolina granite. It is located at the town square of Portsmouth, on Court Street at the corner of High Street.  Also facing on the town square are the Trinity Episcopal Church dating from 1828 and the Portsmouth Courthouse dating from 1846, which are also NRHP-listed.

It was erected by the Ladies Memorial Aid Association of Portsmouth, Virginia, which was founded in 1866 with one purpose "being the erection of a monument to the Confederate dead of Portsmouth and Norfolk County." The design was by topographical engineer Charles E. Cassell.

The cornerstone was laid in 1876.The monument's capstone was not placed until 1881, and the monument as a whole was not completed until 1893.

The four cast white bronze figures that surround the obelisk, including their heads and facial features, are largely generic. The sailor figure, for example, also appears outside the G.A.R. Memorial Hall in Wabash, Indiana.

The city of Portsmouth "gave 1,242 men to the Confederacy of whom 199 were killed or died; Norfolk County gave 1,018 men to the cause of whom 280 were killed or died; and the City of Norfolk gave 1,119  of whom 176 were killed or died."

Calls for removal and relocation 
In August 2017, in the wake of the "Unite the Right" rally in Charlottesville Virginia where many white supremacist groups protested the removal of Confederate monuments, mayor of Portsmouth John Rowe called for the movement of the monument from its current location. Mayor Rowe's proposed new site for the monument is nearby Cedar Grove Cemetery where many Confederate soldiers are buried. Shortly after the mayor's announcement, a Change.org petition amassing over 30,000 signatures went viral started by a local Virginia man named Nathan Coflin to have the current monument replaced by a statue of Portsmouth native rap artist and businesswoman, Missy "Misdemeanor" Elliott. This petition received national attention in many publications such as Newsweek, CNN, People and Time magazine.

On June 10, 2020 the Confederate soldier statues were beheaded by sledgehammer and one was toppled by Black Lives Matter protesters as the Police Department watched. A brass band played. One protester, Chris Green, was hit by the falling statue and sustained life-threatening injuries while standing near other people below it.

Removal 
On July 28, 2020, the Portsmouth City Council voted unanimously to remove the monument.  On August 26, 2020, crews officially began removing the monument from Olde Towne and moving it to a undisclosed storage area.  The monument has since been removed.

See also
 List of monuments and memorials removed during the George Floyd protests

References

External links
Conservation of the Portsmouth Confederate Monument

1870s establishments in Virginia
1876 establishments in Virginia
1876 sculptures
American Civil War sites
Buildings and structures completed in 1876
Buildings and structures in Portsmouth, Virginia
Confederate States of America monuments and memorials in Virginia
Granite sculptures in Virginia
Monuments and memorials on the National Register of Historic Places in Virginia
National Register of Historic Places in Portsmouth, Virginia
Obelisks in the United States
Vandalized works of art in Virginia
Statues removed in 2020
Monuments and memorials in Virginia removed during the George Floyd protests